Marie O'Gorman is a former camogie player, captain of the All Ireland Camogie Championship winning team in 1945.

1945 final
The final was played at Cappoquin, at a time both Cork and Dublin were suspended by camogie central council.

Presentation
Prior to the 1945 final she exchanged gifts with her Waterford counterpart Biddy McGrath, receiving a box of chocolates and presenting a pound of tea, reflecting war-time shortages in the two jurisdictions. The O'Duffy Cup was not presented as Dublin, in dispute with the Camogie Association, had not returned it.

References

External links
 Camogie.ie Official Camogie Association Website
 Wikipedia List of Camogie players

Living people
Antrim camogie players
Year of birth missing (living people)